Stef Broks (born 1 May 1981 in Etten-Leur, Netherlands) is a Dutch drummer best known for his work with Textures. He is known for playing rock and metal with a fusion touch and an extensive use of polyrhythms. He also had success with the fusion band Exivious, playing on their first album. However, after the band reformed in 2011 and became a full-time band, Broks left citing that he simply couldn't find reasonable time to commit to two full-time bands. He was replaced by Yuma van Eekelen, who left Pestilence to join Exivious. Broks currently teaches at the Herman Brood Academy and Het Popstation in Utrecht and the Metal Factory in Eindhoven.

Equipment
Broks uses Meinl cymbals, Tama drums, Evans drum heads and Pro-Mark sticks.
Tama Starclassic drum set
Tama Speed Cobra Double Pedal
Meinl 13" Byzance Traditional hi-hat
Meinl 17" Soundcaster Custom Medium Crash
Meinl 14" Soundcaster Custom Medium Crash
Meinl 16" Soundcaster Custom China
Meinl 12" Soundcaster Custom Splash
Meinl 16" Soundcaster Custom Medium Crash
Meinl 20" Mb10 Medium Ride
Evans drum heads
Pro-Mark Shira Kashi Oak 5A Sticks
Pearl Sensitone Elite Brass Snare 14x5"

Discography

Textures – Polars (2003)
Textures – Drawing Circles (2006)
Textures – Silhouettes (2008)
Exivious – Exivious (2009)
Zhabareth – Zhabareth (2009)
Cube X – Kanzi's Word List (2011)
Textures – Dualism (2011)
Textures – Phenotype (2016)

External links
Stef Broks at MySpace
Textures official website
Exivious official site
Textures at Encyclopaedia Metallum
Textures at Last.fm

References

1981 births
Living people
Male drummers
Dutch heavy metal drummers
People from Etten-Leur
21st-century drummers
21st-century male musicians